The Mosque Ibrahim Ibin Abdul Aziz Al-Ibrahim or Caracas Mosque is a mosque in the El Recreo district of Caracas, Venezuela. It is the second largest mosque in Latin America after the King Fahd Islamic Cultural Center in Buenos Aires. Mirroring modern Venezuela's religious tolerance and its oil realpolitik the construction of the mosque began in 1989 by Sheikh Abdulaziz Bin Ibrahim Al Ibrahim. The mosque designed by architect Zuhair Fayez occupies an area of 5000 m²,  its minaret is 113 metres high and the dome is  23 metres high. Construction of the mosque was completed in 1993. The mosque can hold around 3500 worshipers.
Rising higher between the Catholic Cathedral a few blocks away and the Caracas Synagogue, the minaret is the highest in the Americas.

"It is like a dream come true for us," Hassan Majzoub, president of Venezuela's Islamic Center, said of the four-year project, culminated in March 1993 with the inauguration of the Caracas Islamic Center.

Mr. Majzoub, a shopkeeper who emigrated from Lebanon in 1968, acknowledged that the 100,000 Muslims in Venezuela were easily surpassed in number by Muslims in Argentina, Brazil and the United States.

This mosque is equipped with the following amenities. 

 A 1200 m² room for religious festivals, conferences and multiple uses from sports to social, has basketball, soccer and volleyball courts, also equipped with restrooms for men and women.
 A classroom equipped for the teaching of the Arabic language and the Islamic religion.
 A fully equipped funeral room to wash the dead and prepare them for burial.
 Two apartments.
 A fully equipped kitchen with an adjoining room.
 Five administrative offices.
 A room to receive visitors.
 External and internal deposits and annexes.
 Parking with capacity for 100 cars
 There are an estimated 50,000 Muslims in Caracas, most of them of Syrian and Lebanese origin.

See also
 List of mosques in the Americas
 Lists of mosques

References

External links

Caracas Getting Continent's Biggest Mosque

1993 establishments in Venezuela
Buildings and structures in Caracas
Mosques in Venezuela
Mosques completed in 1993